The Plummer Mine Headframe is located in Pence, Wisconsin.

History
The headframe was operated from 1904 to 1924. It belonged to an iron mine.

References

Industrial buildings and structures on the National Register of Historic Places in Wisconsin
National Register of Historic Places in Iron County, Wisconsin
Iron mining
Mines in Wisconsin